The women's 10,000 metres event at the 2011 All-Africa Games was held on 14 September.

Results

References
Results
Results

10000
2011 in women's athletics